Andrew or Andy Turner may refer to:

 Andrew Jackson Turner (1832–1905), American politician, newspaper editor, and businessman
 Andrew Turner (politician) (born 1953), Member of Parliament for the Isle of Wight from 2001 to 2017
 Andrew Turner (RAF officer) (born 1967), senior officer and helicopter pilot
 Andy Turner (footballer) (born 1975), English footballer
 Andrew Turner (lacrosse) (born 1978), Canadian lacrosse player
 Andrew D. Turner, member of the Tuskegee Airmen
 Andy Turner (hurdler) (born 1980), British athlete
 Andrew Turner (rugby union) (born 1993), England-born rugby union player
 Aim (musician) (Andrew Turner, born 1970), British musician and DJ
 Andrew and Sharon Turner, English business